Lepidoblepharis is a genus of Central and South American dwarf geckos in the family Sphaerodactylidae, commonly known as scaly-eyed geckos.

Species
Genus Lepidoblepharis contains the following species:
Lepidoblepharis buchwaldi  
Lepidoblepharis colombianus  
Lepidoblepharis conolepis  
Lepidoblepharis duolepis  
Lepidoblepharis emberawoundule  
Lepidoblepharis festae  – brown dwarf gecko
Lepidoblepharis grandis  
Lepidoblepharis heyerorum  
Lepidoblepharis hoogmoedi  – Hoogmoed's scaly-eyed gecko, spotted dwarf gecko
Lepidoblepharis intermedius 
Lepidoblepharis microlepis  
Lepidoblepharis miyatai  
Lepidoblepharis montecanoensis  – Paraguanan ground gekko
Lepidoblepharis nukak 
Lepidoblepharis peraccae  
Lepidoblepharis rufigularis 
Lepidoblepharis ruthveni  
Lepidoblepharis sanctaemartae  
Lepidoblepharis victormartinezi 
Lepidoblepharis williamsi  
Lepidoblepharis xanthostigma

References

Further reading
Peracca MG (1897). "Viaggio del Dr. Enrico Festa nell' Ecuador e regioni vicine. IV. Rettili ". Bollettino dei Musei di Zoologia ed Anatomia comparata della R[egia]. Università di Torino 12 (300): 1-20. (Lepidoblepharis, new genus, pp. 1–2). (in Italian).

 
Geckos
Reptiles of Central America
Reptiles of South America
Lizard genera
Taxa named by Mario Giacinto Peracca